Gerald Brown Jr. (born July 28, 1975) is a retired American basketball player. He was a member of the Harlem Globetrotters.

Basketball career
Brown attended Carl Hayden High School in Phoenix, Arizona.

He played college basketball at Pepperdine University from 1993 to 1998 and was a three-time All-West Coast Conference first team performer. He left Pepperdine ranking 12th on the school's all-time scoring list with 1,467 points.

After going undrafted in the 1998 NBA Draft, Brown was signed as a free agent by the Phoenix Suns on January 25, 1999. In 33 games with the Suns, he averaged 2.4 points per game.

In the following years, Brown spent few seasons in Europe, playing for Hapoel Jerusalem, Partizan, Alba Berlin, Breogán and Fuenlabrada. He also played in Argentina, Australia and Mexico.

Brown coached collegiately at Arizona Christian and Concordia-Irvine before returning to Pepperdine in 2018. He was elevated to assistant coach in August 2019.

References

External links
 Gerald Brown at ACB.com
 Gerald Brown at Euroleague.net
 Gerald Brown at Basketball-Reference.com

1975 births
Living people
ABA League players
Alba Berlin players
American expatriate basketball people in Argentina
American expatriate basketball people in Australia
American expatriate basketball people in Germany
American expatriate basketball people in Israel
American expatriate basketball people in Mexico
American expatriate basketball people in Poland
American expatriate basketball people in Serbia
American expatriate basketball people in Spain
American expatriate basketball people in Venezuela
American men's basketball players
Baloncesto Fuenlabrada players
Basketball players from Los Angeles
CB Breogán players
Gimnasia y Esgrima de Comodoro Rivadavia basketball players
Halcones de Xalapa players
Hapoel Jerusalem B.C. players
Harlem Globetrotters players
Israeli Basketball Premier League players
KK Partizan players
La Crosse Bobcats players
Liga ACB players
Panteras de Miranda players
Pepperdine Waves men's basketball players
Perth Wildcats players
Phoenix Suns players
Point guards
Rockford Lightning players
Shooting guards
Undrafted National Basketball Association players